The 2022 Sud Ladies Cup was an international association football tournament held in Bouches-du-Rhône, France. The four national teams involved in the tournament were required to register a squad of 24 players; only players in these squads were eligible to take part in the tournament.

The age listed for each player is on 22 June 2022, the first day of the tournament. The club listed was the club for which the player last played a competitive match prior to the tournament. The nationality for each club reflects the national association (not the league) to which the club is affiliated. A flag is included for coaches that are of a different nationality than their own national team.

France
The 24-player squad was announced on 16 June 2022. On 20 June, Chloé Tapia withdrew and was replaced by Baby-Jordy Benera.

Head coach:

Mexico
The 20-player squad was announced on 15 June 2022.

Head coach: Maribel Domínguez

Netherlands
The 24-player squad was announced on 2 June 2022. On 13 June, Danielle de Jong withdrew due to injury and was replaced by Femke Liefting.

Head coach:

United States
The 24-player squad was announced on 14 June 2022.

Head coach: Tracey Kevins

References

Sud Ladies Cup squads
Sud Ladies Cup